Germaine Sergio van Dijk (born 4 August 1983) is a Surinamese professional footballer who plays as a midfielder for SVB Eerste Divisie club Bintang Lahir.

International career 
Van Dijk played a total of 29 matches for Suriname from 2006 to 2011. He only scored one goal for the national team.

International goals 
 Suriname score listed first, score column indicates score after the van Dijk goal.

Honours 
FCS Nacional
 SVB Cup: 2004–05
 Suriname President's Cup: 2005

WBC
 Suriname President's Cup: 2009

Inter Moengotapoe
 SVB Hoofdklasse: 2012–13, 2013–14, 2014–15, 2015–16
 SVB Cup: 2011–12
 Suriname President's Cup: 2011, 2012, 2013

References

External links 
 
 
 

1983 births
Living people
Surinamese footballers
Association football midfielders
Suriname international footballers
Sportspeople from Paramaribo
FCS Nacional players
S.V. Walking Boyz Company players
Inter Moengotapoe players
S.V. Jong Rambaan players
S.C.V. Bintang Lahir players
SVB Eerste Divisie players